Jose María Martínez Martínez (born 9 June 1972) is a Mexican politician affiliated with the PAN. He currently serves as Senator of the LXII Legislature of the Mexican Congress representing Jalisco, and previously served in the Congress of Jalisco.

References

1972 births
Living people
Politicians from Jalisco
Members of the Senate of the Republic (Mexico)
National Action Party (Mexico) politicians
21st-century Mexican politicians
Members of the Congress of Jalisco
Senators of the LXII and LXIII Legislatures of Mexico